EWS may refer to:

Education 
 East Woods School, in Oyster Bay Cove, New York
 Elizabeth Woodville School, in Northamptonshire, England
 The Emery/Weiner School, in Houston, Texas

Other uses 
 DB Cargo UK, a British rail freight company formerly named English, Welsh & Scottish Railway
 Early warning score
 Early warning system
 Earthquake warning system, a network of seismometers that detect an earthquake already in progress to provide notice of incoming shaking to people further away from the epicenter.
 Economically Weaker Section, in India
 Environmental Waste Solutions, an American business consulting firm
 Ewing sarcoma breakpoint region 1, a protein
 EWS Arena, in  Göppingen, Germany
 Exchange Web Services, a protocol introduced in Microsoft Exchange Server